Pinchas Tibor Rosenbaum (1923–1980) was a Hungarian-born Swiss Jewish rabbi and businessman and one of the heads of the Jewish community in Switzerland who saved hundreds of Jews during The Holocaust. After the war, he was involved in extensive businesses relating to the economy of Israel. He was also instrumental in helping the new State of Israel with security issues and worked for the Mossad on intelligence matters.

Life 

Rosenbaum was born  in Kisvárda. He was the son of Rabbi Shmuel Shmelke Rosenbaum, Chief Rabbi of Kisvárda, son of Rabbi Moshe Chaim Rosenbaum who was also the Rabbi of Kisvárda and author of Lechem Rav. Their lineage went back to Rabbi Judah Loew ben Bezalel.

At age 18, he received semikhah (rabbinical ordination) from Rabbi Yitzhak HaLevi Herzog.

During The Holocaust, Rosenbaum saved hundreds of Jews while being disguised as a German SS officer, a soldier in the Hungarian Arrow Cross, or as a member of the Hungarian Levente, depending on the situation.

After the war he returned to Kisvárda where there were now only 400 Jews instead of the 5,000 who lived there before the war. He was installed as the city's rabbi, replacing his late father. He married Stephanie Stern who survived on the Kastner train that brought Jews from Budapest to Bergen-Belsen and then to Switzerland. The couple lived in Geneva. He earned a doctorate in economics and published two books.

He was buried on Har HaMenuchot.

Fraudulent business activities 

Soon after the establishment of Israel, Mr. Rosenbaum started an organisation called "Helvis Company" to actively promote Israeli‐Swiss trade. A decade later Helvis was alleged to having given kickbacks into a special fund of the National Religious party to obtain contracts from the Ministry of Health in connection with two hospitals near Tel Aviv.

Together with his friend Bernard Cornfeld, Rosenbaum founded the Banque De Credit International Genève in Geneva in the 1959, which went bankrupt in 1976, combined with a considerable loss of prestige for the Hessische Landesbank, which was most recently closely associated with it. Rosenbaum originally financed arms purchases for Israel through the bank. For the major organized crime figure Meyer Lansky, who first met Rosenbaum in 1965, the bank also opened a connection to Israel.

In 1963, its board of directors was composed of Pierre Audéoud (Chair), Samuel Scheps (Deputy Chair), Jacques Leimbacher (Assistant Director), Chaim Haller (Deputy) and Tibor Rosenbaum. Sylvain Ferdman, who was BCI's office manager in Geneva, acted as "money courier" for Meyer Lansky and other U.S. customers of the bank.

In 1973, it had two branches in Luxembourg and London. During its active time, it had deposits from 8,000 people of the Jewish community living in France.

According to Richard Gilbride's book "Matrix for Assassination: The JFK Conspiracy", the bank was responsible for handling up to 90% of the Israeli Defense Ministry's arms purchases.

The bank is also notable for Avner Less, the Adolf Eichmann interrogator, having worked there from 1968 - 1973.

It went into liquidation and was deleted from the Swiss commercial register in 2011.

Children 

Rabbi Moshe (Eric) Rosenbaum, teaches in Yeshivas Derech Etz Chaim in Har Nof, Jerusalem
Leah Rowe, lives in Rehavya, Jerusalem
Shmuel (Charles), *1952, lives in Geneva, who, as Geneva head of investment vehicle Cifco, was an associate of Ephraim Margulies notable for the Guinness share-trading fraud related to Ivan Boesky, the Jewish-American stock trader.

References 

1923 births
1980 deaths
20th-century Hungarian businesspeople
20th-century Swiss businesspeople
20th-century Swiss rabbis
Hungarian Ashkenazi Jews
Hungarian Orthodox rabbis
Swiss Ashkenazi Jews
Swiss Orthodox rabbis
People from Kisvárda
Businesspeople from Geneva
Holocaust survivors
Burials at Har HaMenuchot
Hungarian emigrants to Switzerland
20th-century Hungarian rabbis